The Swaim House is a historic house in Chapel Hill, Tennessee, U.S.. It was built in the 1840s, and designed in the Greek Revival architectural style. It belonged to James Fulton, E. G. Forrest, William Turner and J.F. Brittain until J. M. Swain purchased it in 1893. It remained in the Swaim family until the 1980s, when his great-granddaughter Joy Lewter was the homeowner. The house was extended over the years, with the addition of a rear shed circa 1945 and a garage in 1982. It has been listed on the National Register of Historic Places since July 12, 1984.

References

Houses on the National Register of Historic Places in Tennessee
Greek Revival houses in Tennessee
Houses completed in 1845
National Register of Historic Places in Marshall County, Tennessee